Waukesha County Technical College (WCTC) is a public community college in Waukesha County, Wisconsin. The college has campuses in Waukesha and Pewaukee. It is a member of the Wisconsin Technical College System.

Accreditation
WCTC is accredited by the Higher Learning Commission (HLC) and is a member of the North Central Association of Colleges and Schools.

Notable alumni
Paul Farrow, businessman and legislator
Ben Rothwell, professional mixed martial artist, current UFC Heavyweight
Keri Craig-Lee, Australian fashion designer.
Justin Aprahamian, James Beard Award winning chef

References

External links

Wisconsin technical colleges
Education in Waukesha County, Wisconsin
Buildings and structures in Waukesha, Wisconsin